Merrionette Park is a village in Cook County, Illinois, United States. The population was 1,969 as of the 2020 census.

Geography
Merrionette Park is located at  (41.684, -87.701).

Demographics
As of the 2020 census there were 1,969 people, 923 households, and 371 families residing in the village. The racial makeup of the village was 61.86% White, 17.67% African American, 0.46% Native American, 1.07% Asian, 8.99% from other races, and 9.95% from two or more races. Hispanic or Latino of any race were 19.25% of the population.

There were 923 households, out of which 41.93% had children under the age of 18 living with them, 27.09% were married couples living together, 11.81% had a female householder with no husband present, and 59.80% were non-families. 50.81% of all households were made up of individuals, and 19.39% had someone living alone who was 65 years of age or older. The average household size was 3.51 and the average family size was 2.14.

The village's age distribution consisted of 21.4% under the age of 18, 6.0% from 18 to 24, 32.4% from 25 to 44, 24.2% from 45 to 64, and 15.9% who were 65 years of age or older. The median age was 38.9 years. For every 100 females, there were 82.0 males. For every 100 females age 18 and over, there were 73.5 males.

The median income for a household in the village was $43,047, and the median income for a family was $83,309. Males had a median income of $35,792 versus $34,375 for females. The per capita income for the village was $27,153. About 3.2% of families and 8.1% of the population were below the poverty line, including 4.5% of those under age 18 and 12.8% of those age 65 or over.

Note: the US Census treats Hispanic/Latino as an ethnic category. This table excludes Latinos from the racial categories and assigns them to a separate category. Hispanics/Latinos can be of any race.

Government
Merrionette Park is in Illinois's 3rd congressional district.

The Merrionette Park Fire Department provides fire protection and emergency medical services within the village. The department was established on May 23, 1949 after an ordinance was adopted in the village's municipal code to create a fire department. Prior to the formation of the Merrionette Park Fire Department, fire protection was provided by Blue Island and Chicago fire departments.

Recreation
Merrionette Park is home to the Merrionette Park baseball fields, where children of all ages play every summer. Merrionette Park Baseball is a volunteer organization.

References

External links
Village of Merrionette Park official website
Alsip-Merrionette Park Public Library District

Villages in Illinois
Villages in Cook County, Illinois
Chicago metropolitan area
Populated places established in 1947
1947 establishments in Illinois